WOW is the first leader album by Japanese pianist Junko Onishi, released on January 20, 1993 in Japan.

Track listing

Personnel
Junko Onishi - Piano
Tomoyuki Shima - Bass
Dairiki Hara - Drums

Production
Producer - Junko Onishi
Executive Producer - Hitoshi Namekata
Recording and Mixing Engineer - Masuzo Iida
Assistant Engineer - Yoshimitsu Kubota, Satoshi Nakazawa
Mastering engineer - Yoshio Okazuki
Cover Photograph - Kunihiro Takuma
Art director - Kaoru Taku
A&R - Yoshiko Tsuge

References

External links
Junko Onishi HP

1993 debut albums
Junko Onishi albums